Pesaro Cathedral is a Roman Catholic cathedral in Pesaro, Marche, Italy, dedicated to the Assumption of the Virgin Mary.

It is the archiepiscopal seat of the Archdiocese of Pesaro.

Gallery

References

Roman Catholic cathedrals in Italy
Cathedrals in the Marche
Roman Catholic churches in Pesaro